Azz Izz (released July 4, 1995)   is the only album from R&B group, MoKenStef. Their biggest hit was "He's Mine", which peaked at number 7 on the Billboard Hot 100. Their second single, "Sex in the Rain," generated much less success, reaching number 63 on the R&B chart.  The album was certified gold by the RIAA on December 13, 1995.

Critical reception 

AllMusic's Stephen Thomas Erlewine commended the trio's vocal performance but felt they lacked charisma, personality and content to make them come across more than a poor imitation of TLC's CrazySexyCool, concluding that "too much of Azz Izz is  mediocre material." Vibe contributor Kara Manning also felt the group failed to deliver the "vocal ingenuity" to match that album, concluding that "[W]hile Mokenstef fall short of a fresher, sassier sensuality, Azz Izz isn't a bad first outing, just an uninspired one."

Track listing

References 

1995 albums
MoKenStef albums
Def Jam Recordings albums